M. Saroja was an Indian actress and comedian who worked in Tamil cinema. She was frequently paired alongside K. A. Thangavelu.

Career
Director K. Subramaniam introduced Saroja to the film industry, when she was 14 years old. She played the role of leading Tamil actor M. G. Ramachandran’s cousin in the film Sarvadhikari, her debut. Later on, she continued to act in more than 300 films in Tamil, Telugu, Hindi and Kannada languages. The most important film in her career was the Kalyana Parisu in which she paired with her husband K. A. Thangavelu.

Personal life
On the 100th day celebrations of Kalyana Parisu, Saroja and Thangavelu got married in Madurai Murugan Temple. They have a daughter Sumathi. Thangavelu died in 1994.

Death
On 2 April 2012, she died due to cardiac arrest at her home in T. Nagar, Chennai. She was 79 years old.

Awards
The Tamil Nadu Government felicitated her with Kalaimamani Award in appreciation. She also won the Tamil Nadu State Film Honorary Award - Sivaji Ganesan Award in 2002.

Filmography (Partial)

References

2012 deaths
Tamil comedians
Indian Tamil people
People from Tamil Nadu
Place of birth missing
1933 births
Indian film actresses